XHPQGA-FM is a radio station on 88.9 FM in Quiroga, Michoacán. It carries the Ke Buena national grupera format from Radiópolis.

History
XHPQGA was awarded in the IFT-4 radio auction of 2017 and came to air in early 2018. XHPTAC, together with sister station XHPTAC in Tacámbaro, are Grupo Vox's first commercially licensed radio stations.

References

Radio stations in Michoacán
Radio stations established in 2018
2018 establishments in Mexico